Alejandra Frausto Guerrero is a  Mexican lawyer and cultural director. Since 1 December 2018, she is the head of Secretariat of Culture of Mexico appointed by President Andrés Manuel López Obrador.

Bio 
Frausto is a lawyer by the National Autonomous University of Mexico. From 2004 to 2006 she served as cultural director of the University of the Cloister of Sor Juana. In 2018 she was announced as the head of Secretariat of Culture in the 2018 to 2024 administration  assuming on December 1 from that year.

References

Living people
National Autonomous University of Mexico alumni
Year of birth missing (living people)
Women Secretaries of State of Mexico
21st-century Mexican politicians
21st-century Mexican women politicians
Cabinet of Andrés Manuel López Obrador
Mexican Secretaries of Culture